Richard Nash may refer to:

Richard Nash (MP for Worcester) (died 1605), Member of Parliament (MP) for Worcester
Richard Nash (MP died 1395), MP for Herefordshire and Hereford
Richard Nash (Australian politician) (1890–1951), Australian Senator
Richard C. Nash (born 1950), U.S. Army general
Beau Nash (1674–1761), born Richard Nash, English dandy
N. Richard Nash (1913–2000), writer and dramatist
Dick Nash (born 1928), American jazz trombonist
Rick Nash (born 1984), Canadian hockey player
Rick Nash (comics), a character from Cerebus the Aardvark comics